The Panhandle Regional Planning Commission (PRPC) is a voluntary association of cities, counties and special districts in the Texas Panhandle.

Based in Amarillo, the Panhandle Regional Planning Commission is a member of the Texas Association of Regional Councils.

Counties served

Largest cities in the region
Amarillo
Pampa
Hereford
Borger
Dumas
Canyon
Dalhart
Perryton
Childress

References

External links
Panhandle Regional Planning Commission - Official site.

Texas Association of Regional Councils